Armenian Street (Chinese: 亚米尼亚街) is a street in Central Singapore located in the Museum Planning Area. The street covers a short distance that starts from Coleman Street and ends at the junction of Stamford Road and Waterloo Street. The road houses a couple of landmarks including The Substation and the Old Tao Nan School which is the Peranakan Museum, part of the Asian Civilisations Museum. The museum officially opened in 2008.

See also
List of places named after Armenia

References

Victor R Savage, Brenda S A Yeoh (2004), Toponymics A Study of Singapore's Street Names, Eastern University Press, 

Roads in Singapore
Museum Planning Area